The FA Women's Premier League Cup 2007–08 was the 17th staging of the FA Women's Premier League Cup, a knockout competition for England's top 36 women's football clubs.

The tournament was won by Everton L.F.C., who beat previous holders Arsenal L.F.C. 1–0 in the final; this was Everton's first title.

Preliminary round
All played on 2 September.

First round
All played 30 September, except Liverpool vs. Leeds United and Cardiff City vs. Arsenal, both on 7 October. Charlton Athletic forfeited due to economic problems and Sunderland thus won by walkover.

Second round

Quarter finals
All played 4 November.

Semi finals
All played 16 December.

Final

In a shock result, Everton won the final with an early goal from Amy Kane, securing their first trophy since the 1997–98 FA Women's Premier League. Arsenal's defeat was their first in 58 domestic matches, a run stretching back two years to their humbling by Charlton Athletic in the 2005–06 final of the same competition.

See also
 2007–08 FA Women's Premier League
 2008 FA Women's Cup Final

References

External links
 FA Women's Premier League Cup history - TheFA.com

FA Women's National League Cup
Prem